Samuel Edward Bowens (March 23, 1938 – March 28, 2003) was a backup outfielder in Major League Baseball who played for the Baltimore Orioles (1963–1967) and Washington Senators (1968–1969). Bowens batted and threw right-handed. He was born in Wilmington, North Carolina. During his playing career he was considered to have one of the strongest throwing arms in the league, however knee injuries and drinking problems cut his career short. He was named "one of the nicest people I have ever met" by former teammate Wally Bunker.

Early career
Bowens played four sports at Williston High School in Wilmington. He received a $5,000 signing bonus from the Orioles and started his minor league baseball career with the Bluefield Orioles of the Appalachian League and the Leesburg Orioles of the Florida State League in 1960.

Major League Baseball
In 1963, Bowens appeared in 15 games, batting .333 with one home run and nine runs batted in. In his first full year, 1964, Bowens batted .263, with 22 home runs, 71 RBI, 58 runs, 132 hits, 25 doubles, in 139 games. His playing time declined however, because of injuries, an alcohol addiction, and the blossoming of 1965 American League Rookie of the Year Curt Blefary. In 1965 he appeared in 84 games, batting only .163 with seven home runs and 20 runs batted in. He hit over .200 only once more in his career, in 1966 when he hit .210 in 89 games while he was hit by a pitch five times, finishing tenth in the league. He was a member of the 1966 World Series champion Orioles, but he didn't appear in a game. His World Series ring was allegedly stolen from a hotel room a year later. He later described his career with the Orioles as "wasted years".

After the 1967 season, his contract was purchased by the Washington Senators, where he finished his career with batting averages of .191 and .193 in 1968 and 1969.
 
In a seven-season career, Bowens posted a .223 batting average with 45 home runs and 143 RBI in 479 games.

Later life
Bowens had three children and lived in Indianapolis before moving back to Wilmington in the mid 1980s. He spent his final year in a nursing home in Wilmington, where he died, at the age of 65.

References

External links

Sam Bowens at Baseball Almanac
Sam Bowens at Baseballbiography.com
Venezuelan Winter League

1938 births
2003 deaths
African-American baseball players
Baltimore Orioles players
Baseball players from North Carolina
Bluefield Orioles players
Buffalo Bisons (minor league) players
Columbus Jets players
Fox Cities Foxes players
Leesburg Orioles players
Major League Baseball left fielders
Major League Baseball right fielders
Rochester Red Wings players
Shreveport Braves players
Sportspeople from Wilmington, North Carolina
Tennessee State Tigers baseball players
Tennessee State University alumni
Tigres de Aragua players
American expatriate baseball players in Venezuela
Washington Senators (1961–1971) players
20th-century African-American sportspeople
21st-century African-American people